Fernand Steenacker (26 February 1931 – 26 March 2018) was a Belgian rower. Together with his brother Henri he competed in double sculls at the 1956 Summer Olympics, but failed to reach the final.

References

1931 births
2018 deaths
Belgian male rowers
Rowers at the 1956 Summer Olympics
Olympic rowers of Belgium
People from Bredene